Unmanned military vehicles may refer to:

 Unmanned aerial vehicle
 Unmanned combat air vehicle
 Unmanned naval vehicle
 Unmanned ground vehicle